Moskovskaya metro station may refer to:
Moskovskaya (Nizhny Novgorod Metro), a station of the Nizhny Novgorod Metro, Nizhny Novgorod, Russia
Moskovskaya (Saint Petersburg Metro), a station of the St. Petersburg Metro, St. Petersburg, Russia
Moskovskaya (Samara Metro), a station of the Samara Metro, Samara, Russia
Moskovskaya (Moscow Metro), a station of the Moscow Metro, Moscow, Russia

See also
Moskovsky (disambiguation)